The 2013 A-League All Stars Game was a football match that took place on 20 July 2013 at ANZ Stadium in Sydney, contested between the A-League All Stars and English Premier League champions Manchester United.

Background
Tickets which went on sale earlier in the year sold out in minutes. A Manchester United training session which was open to the public attracted 22,000 people at Allianz Stadium. It is the first time since 1999 that Manchester United have visited Australia. On 18 March 2013, it was announced Melbourne Victory coach Ange Postecoglou will coach the all-stars squad, chosen by fans who voted.

Some A-League players, including Alessandro Del Piero and Emile Heskey, were not able to play due to other commitments.

A-League All Stars players

Match

Details

Statistics

Broadcasting
In Australia, the match was broadcast live by the Seven Network, after they secured the rights to the inaugural A-League All Stars game on 23 May 2013. In the UK, the match was broadcast live on Manchester United's subscription television channel MUTV.

Sponsorship
A-League All Stars partners:

 Foxtel
 Hyundai
 NSW Government
 Nike

References

2013
2013 in Australian soccer
A-League All Stars Game 2013